Giorgio Walter Canonica (Born October 25, 1947) is an Italian allergist, pulmonologist and professor of Respiratory Medicine at Humanitas University, Milan, Italy and Director Personalized Medicine Asthma & Allergy Center at Humanitas Research Hospital IRCCS-Milano Italy since December 2016. He is known for his research work related to innovative treatment strategies for allergic diseases which includes biological response modifier in form of targeted immunotherapy with primary emphasis on sublingual immunotherapy (SLIT). He has served as Secretary General and President elect of World Allergy Organisation for six consecutive years and has served as president of the same organization during 2007–09. He is also the vice-president of INTERASMA.

Early life and education 
Canonica received his master's degree from School of Medicine, University of Genoa during 1972. He started his career as a specialist in pulmonary disease at University of Genoa. He then moved to Florence University while keeping the primary specialization in Allergy and Clinical Immunology. Consequently, he carried out research works in clinical immunology and allergology research from University of Uppsala, Sweden and Medical University of South Carolina, Charleston, USA.

Career 
Canonica returned to Genoa University in 1995 and served at different positions including the full professor Internal Medicine and Pulmonary Medicine, Director of the Speciality School of Allergy and Clinical Immunology, Director of the Specialty School of Pulmonary Diseases, Chairman of the Department of Medical Specialties (University Hospital San Martino Genoa, Italy), Laurea Honoris Causa, Cluji Medical University, Romania etc.. He is also currently serving as Editor in chief of Current Opinion in Allergy and Clinical Immunology.

Previously, Canonica worked as the president of World Allergy Organization (WAO), Global Asthma Association (INTERASMA), Italian Society of Allergy, Asthma and Clinical Immunology (SIAAIC) and Italian Society of Respiratory Medicine (SIMeR). He is presently serving as the ExCom Member of Allergic Rhinitis and its Impact on Asthma (ARIA), board members of Collegium Internationale Allergologicum (CIA) and Global Allergy & Asthma Excellence Network (GA²LEN). He is also working as the Vice-president of Respiratory Effectiveness Group (REG), Chair of the Methodology Committee (EAACI), International advocate of Global Asthma InitiAtive (GINA). Canonica is one of the steering committee members of Severe Asthma Network Italy registry (SANI) and member of European Academy of Sciences.

Research areas 

Canonica's research areas primarily include the observations of molecular events, which further includes interactivity of epithelial cells, inflammatory cells and immunocompetent cells in allergic inflammation and airway remodeling. He is also known to be involved in innovative treatment strategies for allergic diseases including biological response modifier in form of targeted immunotherapy with primary emphasis on sublingual immunotherapy (SLIT).

Notable publications

References

See also 

 Giorgio Walter Canonica publications indexed by Google Scholar

Living people
1947 births
21st-century Italian physicians
Academic staff of Humanitas University